The Presbyterian College Baseball Complex is a baseball venue on the campus of Presbyterian College in Clinton, South Carolina, USA.  It is home to the Presbyterian College Blue Hose of the Division I Big South Conference.  Also known as the Blue Hose Baseball Complex and The Plex, the field is located on East Maple Street on the college's campus.  The facility was built in the late 1980s.

See also
 List of NCAA Division I baseball venues

References

College baseball venues in the United States
Baseball venues in South Carolina
Sports venues in Laurens County, South Carolina
Presbyterian Blue Hose baseball